Albury is a small village in the southern part of the Canterbury region of the South Island of New Zealand.  It is inland from Timaru and located on State Highway 8 between Pleasant Point and Fairlie. It is in the Mackenzie Country (Mackenzie District).

The population of Albury was 66 people in 27 households in the 2013 New Zealand census.

History
Albury is located in a rural farming district, and for over six years in the 19th century served as the temporary terminus of the branch railway line that would become the Fairlie Branch.  The line was opened on 1 January 1877 and an extension beyond the town to Winscombe opened on 24 August 1883.  Although the Fairlie Branch closed on 2 March 1968, some formation from the line can still be seen around Albury. Albury is thought to have been named by the Kennaway brothers.

Education
It currently has two classrooms, one for years 1 and 2 and one for years 3 to 6. Most children go on to the high school in Fairlie (Mackenzie College).

Water supply
The water supply for the village and those close to SH8 comes from the Downlands scheme. Most of the district is served by the Albury Rural Water Scheme that supplies water for both stock and homesteads. Prior to these schemes houses would pump water from the rivers, or get it from an open water race that was built for stock and human use. Remnants of the water race supplying Mt Nessing Station (A very large farm or ranch greater than 8000 acres (32 km²)) can be seen on the Mt Nessing Golf Club's course. Water for the Albury Scheme is taken from a tributary branch of the Opawa River. This scheme was built in the late 1960s/early 1970s and uses no pumps - the system is driven by gravity. It was served by one low dam until 2000-2002 when another branch of the river was dammed to increase the water flow to the headworks. This was necessary as water flow was becoming too low in the original branch. Filtering for the scheme is performed by a long, dual channel trough that contains various grade of gravel with the coarsest at the bottom (Sand Filter). Little maintenance is required apart from periodic flushing of the filter by flowing water backwards through it.

Picture gallery

Local Clubs and Organisations 
 Mount Nessing Collie Club
 Mount Nessing Golf Club
 Rural Women (Formerly Women's Division of Federated Farmers)

Local Events 
Every year around March/April the Albury Pub/Tavern/Bar is the destination of a mountain bicycle race. The race is called the "Pass to Pub". The race goes for about 35 km from Burkes Pass to the Albury Tavern. Local organisations put on barbecues and sell items for fundraising activities at the end.

References

External links 
 Albury School's official website
 Albury Tavern and Nana's Backpackers website
 Opawa Homestead Bed and Breakfast
 Rural Women New Zealand
 New Zealand Young Farmers
 New Zealand Sheep Dog Trial Association
 Mackenzie County Council

Mackenzie District
Populated places in Canterbury, New Zealand